Cysteine and glycine-rich protein 2 is a protein that in humans is encoded by the CSRP2 gene.

CSRP2 is a member of the CSRP family of genes, encoding a group of LIM domain proteins, which may be involved in regulatory processes important for development and cellular differentiation.  CRP2 contains two copies of the cysteine-rich amino acid sequence motif (LIM) with putative zinc-binding activity, and may be involved in regulating ordered cell growth.  Other genes in the family include CSRP1 and CSRP3.

References

External links

Further reading